Seven armed men raided the residence of reggae musician Bob Marley in Kingston, Jamaica on December 3, 1976, two days before he was to stage a concert in an attempt to quell recent violence. Politicians from across the political spectrum hoped to capitalize on Marley's support. While Marley remained neutral, many viewed him as tacitly supporting the prime minister Michael Manley and his democratic socialist People's National Party (PNP). Marley and three others were shot, but all survived.

Concert and election controversy
Bob Marley claimed to be uninvolved in Jamaican politics and had originally agreed to play the Smile Jamaica Concert on the condition that the concert would not be political. However, after the elections were moved up to December 15, both parties considered Marley's concert scheduled just ten days before to be an endorsement for the PNP.

Assassination attempt
At 8:30pm, on December 3, 1976, two days before the Smile Jamaica Concert, seven men armed with guns raided Marley's house at 56 Hope Road. Marley and his band were on break from rehearsal. Marley's wife, Rita, was shot in the head in her car in the driveway. The gunmen shot Marley in the chest and arm. His manager, Don Taylor, was shot in the legs and torso. Band employee Louis Griffiths took a bullet to his torso as well. There were no fatalities.

Bob Marley told concert chairman Trevor Philips that the leader of the Jamaican Labour Party, Edward Seaga – Michael Manley's political opponent – was alleged to have ordered his bodyguard, Lester "Jim Brown" Coke, to be present during the shooting. Nancy Burke, Marley's neighbour and friend, recalled hearing Wailers percussionist Alvin Patterson say "Is Seaga men! Dem come fi kill Bob!" After the shooting, numerous reports indicated that the gunmen returned to Tivoli Gardens, a neighbourhood loyal to the JLP and home to the notorious Shower Posse.

After the shooting, the American embassy sent a cable titled "Reggae Star Shot: Motive probably political". In the cable, Ambassador Gerard wrote:

Timothy White, in his Marley biography, claimed that information he received from JLP and PNP officials, as well as US law enforcement officials, led him to believe that Carl Byah "Mitchell", a JLP gunman, was contracted by the CIA to organize the Marley shooting and that Lester Coke, aka Jim Brown, led the charge on Hope Road.
Don Taylor, Marley's manager, claimed that both he and Marley were present at court in which the gunmen who shot Marley were tried and executed. According to Taylor, before one of the shooters was killed, he claimed the job was done for the CIA in exchange for cocaine and guns.

Aftermath
Despite the shooting, Marley promised he would perform one song at the Smile Jamaica Concert on December 5 at National Heroes Park, Kingston. In the event, Bob Marley & The Wailers played for 90 minutes.

See also
A Brief History of Seven Killings by Marlon James

References

1976 in Jamaica
1976 crimes in North America
20th century in Kingston, Jamaica
December 1976 events in North America
Failed assassination attempts in North America
Non-fatal shootings
Organized crime events in Jamaica
Attempted assassination